Gabrielle Ruiz (born December 12, 1984) is an American actress best known for playing the role of Valencia Perez on The CW musical comedy-drama series Crazy Ex-Girlfriend. Prior to Crazy Ex-Girlfriend, she performed in several Broadway musicals.

Early life and education
Gabrielle was born to Eduardo and Sylvia Ruiz in Edinburg, Texas. Both parents are of Mexican heritage. She discovered her love of performing at a young age through dance. She was trained in dance at Melba's School of Dance and the Texas Association for Teachers of Dance. She also took vocal lessons and was part of the Texas All-State Choir. She attended public schools through high school, and  graduated from Oklahoma City University with a Bachelor of Fine Arts in Dance Performance in 2007. While in college she was a member of the American Spirit Dance Company, OCU Rhythms, numerous musicals, work-study, and the Alpha Phi women's fraternity.

Career
After college, Ruiz landed various roles on both television and Broadway. Her breakthrough role was playing Valencia Perez on The CW comedy-drama series Crazy Ex-Girlfriend. Lin-Manuel Miranda, the creator of Hamilton, saw her perform in his musical In the Heights and referred her to the CXG show producers. On the basis of his recommendation, she got an audition and then landed the part.

Personal life
On August 4, 2016, Ruiz married Philip Pisanchyn in a small private ceremony at a villa in Saint Martin. They live in New York City and occasionally Los Angeles. On April 28, 2021 she gave birth to a girl, Mercedes.

Filmography

References

External links

21st-century American actresses
Actresses from Texas
Oklahoma City University alumni
Living people
1984 births
American stage actresses
American film actresses
American television actresses
People from Edinburg, Texas
Actresses from New York City
Actresses from Los Angeles
American actresses of Mexican descent